Rhagoletis is a genus of tephritid fruit flies with about 70 species.

Name
The genus name is partially derived from Ancient Greek rhago "a kind of spider". This possibly refers to the fact that at least R. pomonella mimics a jumping spider.

Species 

 Rhagoletis acuticornis (Steyskal, 1979)
 Rhagoletis adusta Foote, 1981
 Rhagoletis almatensis Rohdendorf, 1961
 Rhagoletis alternata (Fallén, 1814)
 Rhagoletis bagheera Richter & Kandybina, 1997
 Rhagoletis basiola (Osten Sacken, 1877)
 Rhagoletis batava Hering, 1958
 Rhagoletis berberidis Jermy, 1961
 Rhagoletis berberis Curran, 1932
 Rhagoletis bezziana (Hendel, 1931)
 Rhagoletis blanchardi Aczel, 1954
 Rhagoletis boycei  Cresson, 1929
 Rhagoletis brncici Frías, 2001
 Rhagoletis caucasica Kandybina & Richter, 1976
 Rhagoletis cerasi (Linnaeus, 1758) – cherry fruit fly
 Rhagoletis chionanthi Bush, 1966
 Rhagoletis chumsanica (Rohdendorf, 1961)
 Rhagoletis cingulata (Loew, 1862) – eastern cherry fruit fly
 Rhagoletis completa Cresson, 1929
 Rhagoletis conversa (Brethes, 1919)
 Rhagoletis cornivora Bush, 1966
 Rhagoletis ebbettsi Bush, 1966
 Rhagoletis electromorpha Berlocher, 1984
 Rhagoletis emiliae Richter, 1974
 Rhagoletis fausta (Osten Sacken, 1877)
 Rhagoletis ferruginea Hendel, 1927
 Rhagoletis flavicincta Enderlein, 1934
 Rhagoletis flavigenualis Hering, 1958
 Rhagoletis freidbergi Korneyev & Korneyev, 2019
 Rhagoletis indifferens Curran, 1932 – western cherry fruit fly
 Rhagoletis jamaicensis Foote, 1981
 Rhagoletis juglandis Cresson, 1920 – walnut husk fly
 Rhagoletis juniperina Marcovitch, 1915
 Rhagoletis kurentsovi (Rohdendorf, 1961)
 Rhagoletis lycopersella Smyth, 1960
 Rhagoletis macquartii (Loew, 1873)
 Rhagoletis magniterebra (Rohdendorf, 1961)
 Rhagoletis meigenii (Loew, 1844)
 Rhagoletis mendax Curran, 1932 – blueberry maggot
 Rhagoletis metallica (Schiner, 1868)
 Rhagoletis mongolica Kandybina, 1972
 Rhagoletis nicaraguensis Hernández-Ortiz, 1999
 Rhagoletis nova (Schiner, 1868)
 Rhagoletis ochraspis (Wiedemann, 1830)
 Rhagoletis osmanthi Bush, 1966
 Rhagoletis penela Foote, 1981
 Rhagoletis persimilis Bush, 1966
 Rhagoletis pomonella (Walsh, 1867) – apple maggot fly, railroad worm
 Rhagoletis psalida Hendel, 1914
 Rhagoletis ramosae Hernandez-Ortiz, 1985
 Rhagoletis reducta Hering, 1936
 Rhagoletis rhytida Hendel, 1914
 Rhagoletis ribicola Doane, 1898
 Rhagoletis rohdendorfi Korneyev & Merz, 1997
 Rhagoletis rumpomaculata Hardy, 1964
 Rhagoletis samojlovitshae (Rohdendorf, 1961)
 Rhagoletis scutellata Zia, 1938
 Rhagoletis solanophaga Hernández-Ortiz & Frías, 1999
 Rhagoletis striatella Wulp, 1899
 Rhagoletis suavis (Loew, 1862) – walnut husk maggot
 Rhagoletis tabellaria (Fitch, 1855)
 Rhagoletis tomatis Foote, 1981
 Rhagoletis turanica (Rohdendorf, 1961)
 Rhagoletis turpiniae Hernandez-Ortiz, 1993
 Rhagoletis willinki Aczel, 1951
 Rhagoletis zephyria Snow, 1894
 Rhagoletis zernyi Hendel, 1927
 Rhagoletis zoqui Bush, 1966

Synonyms:
 Rhagoletis achraspis Aczel, 1954: Synonym of Rhagoletis tomatis Foote, 1981
 Rhagoletis caurina Doane, 1899: Synonym of Urophora caurina (Doane, 1899) 
 Rhagoletis grindeliae Coquillett, 1908: Synonym of Urophora grindeliae (Coquillett, 1908)
 Rhagoletis juniperinus Marcovitch, 1915: Synonym of Rhagoletis juniperina Marcovitch, 1915
 Rhagoletis sapporensis Matsumura, 1916: Synonym of Matsumurania sapporensis (Matsumura, 1916)
 Rhagoletis symphoricarpi Curran, 1924: Synonym of Rhagoletis zephyria Snow, 1894
 Rhagoletis willincki Foote, 1967: Synonym of Rhagoletis willinki Aczel, 1951

External links

On the UF / IFAS Featured Creatures Web site
 Rhagoletis cingulata, eastern cherry fruit fly
 Rhagoletis pomonella, apple maggot fly

Database
 Tephritid Workers Database

 
Tephritidae genera
Taxa named by Hermann Loew